San Francesco Saverio also known as the Church of the Suffragio is a Baroque-style Roman Catholic church located in Piazza Ferrari #12 in Rimini, Italy.

History
The church was commissioned by the Jesuit order and built in 1721. The Jesuits previously had been housed in a site in Santa Maria a Mare. The design had been attributed to either Giovanni Francesco Buonamici or Francesco Garampi.

The layout is modelled on the Gesù church in Rome. Adjacent to the church was once the Jesuit convent, which was for years a hospital, and now serves as Civic Museum. The facade remains incomplete in brick, but the interior is richly decorated, despite the suppression of the Jesuits by papal bull in 1773.

Interior Decoration

An inventory in 1864 (also 1901) cited the following works in the church:
St Louis Gonzaga by Andrea Barbiani
St Martin Bishop with St John the Baptist and the Virgin in Glory by Nicolo Frangipane
Crucified Jesuit Martyrs in Japan (including the Blessed Paulo Miki) by Guido Cagnacci, right presbytery (still in situ)
St Nicola and the Souls of Purgatory attributed to Visacci of Urbino, 1st altar left
St Antony (oval) by Giuseppe Soleri Brancaleoni, 1st chapel on left
Departure from Calvary attributed to Zuccheri studio, 1st chapel on left 
Guardian Angel by Angelo Sarzetta, 1st chapel on left
Virgin with Child, St Joseph and St Peter attributed to Antonio Puglieschi
Marriage of the Madonna by Giovanni Battista Costa
Deposition, by Giovanni Cesare Grazi, a copy of the work of Barocci located in Sinigallia
Glory of St Ignatius by Rotari, altar by GF Buonamici, in transept
St Francis Xavier Preaching in the Indies, main altar, by Vincenzo Pisanelli
St Emidius, Patron of Rimini (1788) by GS Brancaleoni, left transept, placed after earthquake of 1786
St Francis Borgia in Adoration of the Virgin painted by Pietro Rotari, in 1st altar right
Annunciation, by Tuscan painter, left presbytery
St Stanislao by Giovanni Maria delle Piane (Molinaretto), copy of GG dal Sole painting, sacristy.
St Michael Arcangelo by Sarzetto, sacristy
Bambino che schiaccia il Drago, by Giovanni Francesco Nagli, sacristy

References

18th-century Roman Catholic church buildings in Italy
Roman Catholic churches in Rimini
Roman Catholic churches completed in 1721
Baroque architecture in Rimini
1721 establishments in the Papal States
1721 establishments in Italy